The 2016–17 Atlanta Hawks season was the 68th season of the franchise in the National Basketball Association (NBA) and the 49th in Atlanta.

The Hawks finished the regular season with a 43–39 record, securing the 5th seed. In the playoffs, they faced off against the Washington Wizards in the First Round, where they lost in six games.

This was the first season since the 2006–07 season that All-Star center Al Horford was not on the Atlanta roster, as he joined the Boston Celtics during the summer. Also, this was the last time until 2021 that the Hawks would make the playoffs.

Draft picks

Roster

Standings

Division

Conference

Game log

Pre-season

|- style="background:#bfb;"
| 1
| October 6
| @ Memphis
| 
| Walter Tavares (15)
| Walter Tavares (10)
| Will Bynum (4)
| Cintas Center13,246
| 1–0
|- style="background:#fbb;"
| 2
| October 8
| @ San Antonio
| 
| Delaney, Prince (13)
| Walter Tavares (7)
| Will Bynum (7)
| AT&T Center18,555
| 1–1
|- style="background:#bfb;"
| 3
| October 10
| Cleveland
| 
| Dwight Howard (26)
| Dwight Howard (8)
| Mike Muscala (5)
| Philips Arena16,202
| 2–1
|- style="background:#fbb;"
| 4
| October 13
| Detroit
| 
| Dennis Schroder (17)
| Dwight Howard (9)
| Dennis Schroder (9)
| Philips Arena10,852
| 2–2
|- style="background:#bfb;"
| 5
| October 16
| @ Orlando
| 
| Hardaway Jr., Millsap (19)
| Paul Millsap (9)
| Paul Millsap (7)
| Amway Arena15,081
| 3–2
|- style="background:#bfb;"
| 6
| October 18
| New Orleans
| 
| Tim Hardaway Jr. (16)
| Dwight Howard (11)
| Dennis Schroder (5)
| Philips Arena10,866
| 4–2
|- style="background:#bfb;"
| 7
| October 20
| @ Chicago
| 
| Howard, Schroder (16)
| Dwight Howard (15)
| Korver, Schroder (6)
| CenturyLink Center16,506
| 5–2

Regular season

|- style="background:#cfc"
| 1
| October 27
| Washington
| 
| Paul Millsap (28)
| Dwight Howard (19)
| Sefolosha, Delaney (5)
| Philips Arena19,049
| 1–0
|- style="background:#cfc"
| 2
| October 29
| @ Philadelphia
| 
| Paul Millsap (17)
| Dwight Howard (7)
| Dennis Schröder (11)
| Wells Fargo Center16,312
| 2–0
|- style="background:#cfc"
| 3
| October 31
| Sacramento
| 
| Dwight Howard (18)
| Dwight Howard (11)
| Paul Millsap (8)
| Philips Arena12,501
| 3–0

|- style="background:#fcc;"
| 4
| November 2
| L. A. Lakers
| 
| Dwight Howard (31)
| Dwight Howard (11)
| Bazemore, Schröder (6)
| Philips Arena13,800
| 3–1
|- style="background:#fcc"
| 5
| November 4
| @ Washington
| 
| Howard, Schröder (20)
| Dwight Howard (12)
| Kent Bazemore (5)
| Verizon Center14,663
| 3–2
|- style="background:#cfc;"
| 6
| November 5
| Houston
| 
| Paul Millsap (23)
| Dwight Howard (14)
| Dennis Schröder (11)
| Philips Arena16,895
| 4–2
|- style= "background:#cfc;"
| 7
| November 8
| @ Cleveland
| 
| Dennis Schröder (28)
| Dwight Howard (17)
| Dennis Schröder (6)
| Quicken Loans Arena 20,562
| 5–2
|- style="background:#cfc;"
| 8
| November 9
| Chicago
| 
| Thabo Sefolosha (20)
| Paul Millsap (11)
| Paul Millsap (6)
| Philips Arena16,354
| 6–2
|- style="background:#cfc;"
| 9
| November 12
| Philadelphia
| 
| Tim Hardaway Jr. (20)
| Dwight Howard (11)
| Dennis Schröder (8)
| Philips Arena17,399
| 7–2
|- style="background:#cfc;"
| 10
| November 15
| @ Miami
| 
| Dennis Schröder (18)
| Dwight Howard (17)
| Schröder, Millsap (4)
| AmericanAirlines Arena19,600
| 8–2
|- style="background:#cfc;"
| 11
| November 16
| Milwaukee
| 
| Paul Millsap (21)
| Paul Millsap (8)
| Dennis Schröder (8)
| Philips Arena14,656
| 9–2
|- style="background:#fcc;"
| 12
| November 18
| @ Charlotte
| 
| Paul Millsap (22)
| Dwight Howard (18)
| Malcolm Delaney (8)
| Time Warner Cable Arena17,989
| 9–3
|- style="background:#fcc;"
| 13
| November 20
| @ New York
| 
| Dwight Howard (18)
| Dwight Howard (18)
| Millsap, Bazemore (5)
| Madison Square Garden19,812
| 9–4
|- style="background:#fcc;"
| 14
| November 22
| New Orleans
| 
| Schroder, Korver (14)
| Paul Millsap (8)
| Dennis Schröder (7)
| Philips Arena19,120
| 9–5
|- style="background:#cfc;"
| 15
| November 23
| @ Indiana
| 
| Dwight Howard (23)
| Dwight Howard (20)
| Paul Millsap (5)
| Bankers Life Fieldhouse16,032
| 10–5
|-style="background:#fcc;"
| 16
| November 25
| @ Utah
| 
| Dennis Schröder (16)
| Howard, Prince (7)
| Taurean Prince (3)
| Vivint Smart Home Arena19,911
| 10–6
|-style="background:#fcc;"
| 17
| November 27
| @ L.A. Lakers
| 
| Kent Bazemore (21)
| Dwight Howard (11)
| Dennis Schröder (8)
| STAPLES Center18,997
| 10–7
|-style="background:#fcc;"
| 18
| November 28
| @ Golden State
| 
| Dennis Schröder (24)
| Dwight Howard (16)
| Dennis Schröder (6)
| ORACLE Arena19,596
| 10–8
|-style="background:#fcc;"
| 19
| November 30
| @ Phoenix
| 
| Dennis Schröder (31)
| Dwight Howard (14)
| Dennis Schröder (9)
| Talking Stick Resort Arena15,909
| 10–9

|- style="background:#fcc;"
| 20
| December 2
| Detroit
| 
| Dennis Schröder (17)
| Howard, Prince (6)
| Dennis Schröder (11)
| Philips Arena15,500
| 10–10
|- style="background:#fcc;"
| 21
| December 3
| @ Toronto
| 
| Dennis Schröder (15)
| Dwight Howard (17)
| Dennis Schröder (6)
| Air Canada Centre19,800
| 10–11
|- style="background:#fcc;"
| 22
| December 5
| Oklahoma City
| 
| Paul Millsap (24)
| Dwight Howard (7)
| Dennis Schröder (8)
| Philips Arena14,654
| 10–12
|- style="background:#cfc;"
| 23
| December 7
| Miami
| 
| Dwight Howard (23)
| Dwight Howard (17)
| Dennis Schröder (7)
| Philips Arena11,326
| 11–12
|- style="background:#cfc;"
| 24
| December 9
| @ Milwaukee
| 
| Dennis Schröder (33)
| Paul Millsap (14)
| Paul Millsap (6)
| BMO Harris Bradley Center16,289
| 12–12
|- style="background:#fcc;"
| 25
| December 13
| Orlando
| 
| Dwight Howard (20)
| Dwight Howard (16)
| Dennis Schröder (13)
| Philips Arena17,789
| 12–13
|- style="background:#cfc;"
| 26
| December 16
| @ Toronto
| 
| Dwight Howard (27)
| Dwight Howard (15)
| Dennis Schröder (6)
| Air Canada Centre19,800
| 13–13
|-style="background:#fcc;"
| 27
| December 17
| Charlotte
| 
| Tim Hardaway Jr. (21)
| Dwight Howard (23)
| Dennis Schröder (6)
| Philips Arena17,918
| 13–14
|- style="background:#cfc;"
| 28
| December 19
| @ Oklahoma City
| 
| Dennis Schröder (31)
| Paul Millsap (11)
| Dennis Schröder (8)
| Chesapeake Energy Arena18,203
| 14–14
|- style="background:#fcc"
| 29
| December 21
| Minnesota
| 
| Dennis Schröder (21)
| Paul Millsap (10)
| Schröder, Millsap (7)
| Philips Arena17,578
| 14–15
|- style="background:#cfc"
| 30
| December 23
| @ Denver
| 
| Dennis Schröder (27)
| Humphries, Millsap (8)
| Dennis Schröder (5)
| Pepsi Center13,823
| 15–15
|- style="background:#fcc"
| 31
| December 26
| @ Minnesota
| 
| Dwight Howard (20)
| Dwight Howard (12)
| Schröder, Muscala (4)
| Target Center15,617
| 15–16
|- style="background:#cfc"
| 32
| December 28
| New York
| 
| Dennis Schröder (27)
| Dwight Howard (22)
| Paul Millsap (6)
| Philips Arena19,066
| 16–16
|-style="background:#cfc"
| 33
| December 30
| Detroit
| 
| Paul Millsap (26)
| Dwight Howard (11)
| Schröder, Delaney (7)
| Philips Arena19,009
| 17-16

|- style="background:#cfc"
| 34
| January 1
| San Antonio
| 
| Paul Millsap (32)
| Paul Millsap (13)
| Dennis Schröder (10)
| Philips Arena18,088
| 18–16
|- style="background:#cfc;"
| 35
| January 4
| @ Orlando
| 
| Dennis Schröder (18)
| Dwight Howard (12)
| Dennis Schröder (7)
| Amway Center18,846
| 19–16
|- style= "background:#cfc;"
| 36
| January 5
| @ New Orleans
| 
| Dennis Schröder (23)
| Dwight Howard (11)
| Malcolm Delaney (8)
| Smoothie King Center 15,003
| 20–16
|-style= "background:#cfc;"
| 37
| January 7
| @ Dallas
| 
| Dennis Schröder (20)
| Dwight Howard (20)
| Paul Millsap (6)
| American Airlines Center19,655
| 21–16
|- style="background:#cfc;"
| 38
| January 10
| @ Brooklyn
| 
| Dennis Schröder (19)
| Dwight Howard (16)
| Dennis Schröder (10)
| Barclays Center13,279
| 22–16
|- style="background:#fcc;"
| 39
| January 13
| Boston
| 
| Hardaway Jr., Millsap (23)
| Dwight Howard (8)
| Paul Millsap (6)
| Philips Arena18,216
| 22–17
|- style="background:#cfc;"
| 40
| January 15
| Milwaukee
| 
| Kent Bazemore (24)
| Dwight Howard (14)
| Dennis Schröder (6)
| Philips Arena14,231
| 23–17
|- style="background:#cfc;"
| 41
| January 16
| @ New York
| 
| Dennis Schröder (28)
| Millsap, Humphries (7)
| Paul Millsap (6)
| Madison Square Garden19,812
| 24–17
|- style="background:#fcc;"
| 42
| January 18
| @ Detroit
| 
| Paul Millsap (21)
| Paul Millsap (8)
| Dennis Schröder (6)
| The Palace of Auburn Hills15,159
| 24–18
|- style="background:#cfc;"
| 43
| January 20
| Chicago
| 
| Dennis Schröder (25)
| Paul Millsap (9)
| Dennis Schröder (6)
| Philips Arena16,328
| 25–18
|- style="background:#cfc;"
| 44
| January 21
| Philadelphia
| 
| Paul Millsap (22)
| Dwight Howard (15)
| Dennis Schröder (9)
| Philips Arena15,116
| 26–18
|- style="background:#fcc;"
| 45
| January 23
| LA Clippers
| 
| Kent Bazemore (25)
| Dwight Howard (12)
| Millsap, Schröder (7)
| Philips Arena12,853
| 26–19
|- style="background:#cfc;"
| 46
| January 25
| @ Chicago
| 
| Dennis Schröder (24)
| Dwight Howard (12)
| Dennis Schröder (9)
| United Center21,445
| 27–19
|- style="background:#fcc;"
| 47
| January 27
| Washington
| 
| Kent Bazemore (15)
| Dwight Howard (13)
| Dennis Schröder (5)
| Philips Arena16,968
| 27–20
|- style="background:#cfc"
| 48
| January 29
| New York
| 
| Paul Millsap (37)
| Paul Millsap (19)
| Dennis Schröder (15)
| Philips Arena13,643
| 28–20

|- style="background:#fcc"
| 49
| February 1
| @ Miami
| 
| Kent Bazemore (14)
| Dwight Howard (11)
| DeAndre' Bembry (3)
| AmericanAirlines Arena19,600
| 28–21
|- style="background:#cfc;"
| 50
| February 2
| @ Houston
| 
| Tim Hardaway Jr (33)
| Dwight Howard (23)
| Kent Bazemore (6)
| Toyota Center15,602
| 29–21
|- style="background:#cfc;"
| 51
| February 4
| Orlando
| 
| Hardaway Jr., Millsap (21)
| Dwight Howard (13)
| Dennis Schröder (10)
| Philips Arena16,691
| 30–21
|- style="background:#fcc;"
| 52
| February 6
| Utah
| 
| Dennis Schröder (21)
| Howard, Millsap (8)
| Hardaway Jr., Millsap, Muscala (3)
| Philips Arena13,126
| 30–22
|- style="background:#cfc;"
| 53
| February 8
| Denver
| 
| Dennis Schröder (24)
| Dwight Howard (13)
| Dennis Schröder (10)
| Philips Arena14,222
| 31–22
|- style="background:#fcc;"
| 54
| February 10
| @ Sacramento
| 
| Tim Hardaway Jr (28)
| Dwight Howard (11)
| Dennis Schröder (6)
| Golden 1 Center17,608
| 31–23
|- style="background:#cfc;"
| 55
| February 13
| @ Portland
| 
| Dennis Schröder (22)
| Dwight Howard (16)
| Kent Bazemore (6)
| Moda Center19,475
| 32–23
|- style="background:#fcc;"
| 56
| February 15
| @ LA Clippers
| 
| Dennis Schröder (15)
| Dwight Howard (15)
| Dwight Howard (7)
| STAPLES Center19,060
| 32–24
|- style="background:#fcc;"
| 57
| February 24
| Miami
| 
| Paul Millsap (21)
| Mike Muscala (9)
| Malcolm Delaney (4)
| Philips Arena18,122
| 32–25
|- style="background:#fcc;"
| 58
| February 25
| @ Orlando
| 
| Tim Hardaway Jr. (15)
| Dwight Howard (14)
| Dennis Schröder (8)
| Amway Center18,498
| 32–26
|- style= "background:#cfc;"
| 59
| February 27
| @ Boston
| 
| Dennis Schröder (21)
| Dwight Howard (12)
| Dennis Schröder (5)
| TD Garden 18,624
| 33–26

|- style= "background:#cfc;"
| 60
| March 1
| Dallas
| 
| Paul Millsap (18)
| Dwight Howard (12)
| Paul Millsap (10)
| Philips Arena12,483
| 34–26
|- style= "background:#fcc;"
| 61
| March 3
| Cleveland
| 
| Tim Hardaway Jr. (36)
| Dwight Howard (10)
| Schroder, Bazemore (7)
| Philips Arena18,877
| 34–27
|- style= "background:#fcc;"
| 62
| March 5
| Indiana
| 
| Tim Hardaway Jr. (24)
| Dwight Howard (14)
| Dennis Schroder (7)
| Philips Arena15,366
| 34–28
|- style= "background:#fcc;"
| 63
| March 6
| Golden State
| 
| Dennis Schroder (23)
| Dwight Howard (19)
| Tim Hardaway Jr. (5)
| Philips Arena18,890
| 34–29
|- style= "background:#cfc;"
| 64
| March 8
| Brooklyn
| 
| Dennis Schröder (31)
| Dwight Howard (14)
| Dennis Schröder (5)
| Philips Arena11,931
| 35–29
|- style= "background:#cfc;"
| 65
| March 10
| Toronto
| 
| Dennis Schröder (26)
| Dwight Howard (10)
| Tim Hardaway Jr. (6)
| Philips Arena16,078
| 36–29
|- style="background:#cfc;"
| 66
| March 11
| @ Memphis
| 
| Taurean Prince (17)
| Paul Millsap (11)
| Dennis Schröder (8)
| FedExForum17,523
| 37–29
|- style="background:#fcc;"
| 67
| March 13
| @ San Antonio
| 
| Dennis Schröder (22)
| Dwight Howard (13)
| Dennis Schröder (10)
| AT&T Center18,418
| 37–30
|- style= "background:#fcc;"
| 68
| March 16
| Memphis
| 
| Tim Hardaway Jr. (18)
| Dwight Howard (10)
| José Calderón (4)
| Philips Arena17,063
| 37–31
|- style= "background:#fcc;"
| 69
| March 18
| Portland
| 
| Ersan Ilyasova (23)
| Dwight Howard (10)
| Dennis Schröder (7)
| Philips Arena16,543
| 37–32
|-style="background:#fcc;"
| 70
| March 20
| @ Charlotte
| 
| Dennis Schröder (20)
| Dwight Howard (10)
| Dennis Schröder (6)
| Spectrum Center14,278
| 37–33
|- style="background:#fcc;"
| 71
| March 22
| @ Washington
| 
| Tim Hardaway Jr. (29)
| Dwight Howard (16)
| Dennis Schröder (6)
| Verizon Center18,137
| 37–34
|- style="background:#fcc;"
| 72
| March 24
| @ Milwaukee
| 
| Dennis Schröder (28)
| Dwight Howard (12)
| Dennis Schröder (7)
| Bradley Center16,786
| 37–35
|- style= "background:#fcc;"
| 73
| March 26
| Brooklyn
| 
| Dennis Schröder (24)
| Ersan Ilyasova (18)
| Dennis Schröder (6)
| Philips Arena15,921
| 37–36
|- style= "background:#cfc;"
| 74
| March 28
| Phoenix
| 
| Dennis Schröder (27)
| Ersan Ilyasova (12)
| Dennis Schröder (9)
| Philips Arena13,412
| 38–36
|- style= "background:#cfc;"
| 75
| March 29
| @ Philadelphia
| 
| Dwight Howard (22)
| Dwight Howard (20)
| Dennis Schröder (5)
| Wells Fargo Center15,212
| 39–36

|- style= "background:#fcc;"
| 76
| April 1
| @ Chicago
| 
| Dennis Schröder (29)
| Dwight Howard (12)
| Dennis Schröder (6)
| United Center22,019
| 39–37
|-style= "background:#fcc;"
| 77
| April 2
| @ Brooklyn
| 
| Dennis Schröder (16)
| Dwight Howard (11)
| Dennis Schröder (8)
| Barclays Center15,040
| 39–38
|-style="background:#cfc;"
| 78
| April 6
| Boston
| 
| Paul Millsap (26)
| Paul Millsap (12)
| Hardaway Jr., Schröder (5)
| Philips Arena18,688
| 40–38
|- style= "background:#cfc;"
| 79
| April 7
| @ Cleveland
| 
| Tim Hardaway Jr. (22)
| Humphries, Ilyasova (7)
| Malcolm Delaney (8)
| Quicken Loans Arena20,562
| 41–38
|- style= "background:#cfc;"
| 80
| April 9
| Cleveland
| 
| Paul Millsap (22)
| Hardaway Jr., Millsap (9)
| Dennis Schröder (5)
| Philips Arena18,835
| 42–38
|- style= "background:#cfc;"
| 81
| April 11
| Charlotte
| 
| Dwight Howard (19)
| Dwight Howard (12)
| Dennis Schröder (9)
| Philips Arena14,205
| 43–38
|- style=background:#fcc;"
| 82
| April 12
| @ Indiana
| 
| Ersan Ilyasova (15)
| Kris Humphries (8)
| Delaney, Calderón (5)
| Bankers Life Fieldhouse17,923
| 43–39

Playoffs

|- style="background:#fcc;"
| 1
| April 16
| @ Washington
| 
| Dennis Schröder (25)
| Dwight Howard (14)
| Dennis Schröder (9)
| Verizon Center20,356
| 0–1
|- style="background:#fcc;"
| 2
| April 19
| @ Washington
| 
| Paul Millsap (27)
| Paul Millsap (10)
| Dennis Schröder (6)
| Verizon Center20,356
| 0–2
|- style="background:#cfc;"
| 3
| April 22
| Washington
| 
| Paul Millsap (29)
| Paul Millsap (14)
| Dennis Schröder (9)
| Philips Arena18,866
| 1–2
|- style="background:#cfc;"
| 4
| April 24
| Washington
| 
| Paul Millsap (19)
| Dwight Howard (15)
| Millsap, Bazemore (7)
| Philips Arena18,676
| 2–2
|- style="background:#fcc;"
| 5
| April 26
| @ Washington
| 
| Dennis Schröder (29)
| Paul Millsap (11)
| Dennis Schröder (11)
| Verizon Center20,356
| 2–3
|- style="background:#fcc;"
| 6
| April 28
| Washington
| 
| Paul Millsap (31)
| Paul Millsap (10)
| Dennis Schröder (10)
| Philips Arena18,849
| 2–4

Transactions

Overview

Trades

Free agents

Re-signed

Additions

* = Did not make 15-man roster

Subtractions

References

Atlanta Hawks seasons
Atlanta Hawks
Atlanta Hawks
Atlanta Hawks